Fanny Salvini-Donatelli ( 1815 – 1891) was an Italian operatic soprano. She is best known today for creating the role of Violetta in Verdi's opera, La traviata, but she was also an admired interpreter of the composer's other works as well as those by Donizetti.

Biography
Fanny Salvini-Donatelli, whose real name was Francesca Lucchi, was born in Florence to a prosperous family. Financial hardship following her father's death led her to a career as an actress. In the early 1830s she became the second wife of the actor, Giuseppe Salvini, (and the stepmother of the much more famous actor Tommaso Salvini). However, her marriage was an unhappy one, as was her relationship with her stepchildren. Following her desertion of the family in 1842, Giuseppe Salvini obtained a separation on the grounds of infidelity. He died two years later. While married to Salvini, she studied singing and made her operatic debut in 1839 at the Teatro Apollo in Venice as Rosina in Il barbiere di Siviglia.

Salvini-Donatelli went on to a major career in Italy singing primarily at La Fenice and the Teatro Regio di Parma, where in 1850 a sonnet in her honour, written by the city's epigramist, Artaserse Folli, was distributed to the audience. She also performed at La Scala, the Teatro Regio di Torino, the Teatro Comunale di Bologna, the Teatro Grande di Trieste and several other Italian theatres. Outside Italy, she sang in Paris, Barcelona, Vienna (where she made her debut in 1843 as Abigaille in Nabucco conducted by Verdi himself), and London (where she made her debut in 1858 at the Theatre Royal, Drury Lane as Leonora in Il trovatore). Although she is primarily remembered for creating the role of Violetta in La traviata, she created four other roles in now forgotten operas: Editta in Giovanni Pacini's Allan Cameron (18 March 1848, La Fenice); Elmina in Salvatore Sarmiento's Elmina (8 February 1851, Teatro Regio di Parma); Clemenza in Gualtiero Sanelli's Il fornaretto (24 March 1851, Teatro Regio di Parma); and Donna Eleonora in Carlo Ercole Bosoni's La prigioniera (16 January 1853, La Fenice).

She was generally thought to have retired from the stage in 1860. However, she is reported as singing at the Théâtre Royal de la Monnaie in Brussels in 1877. Fanny Salvini-Donatelli died in Milan in June 1891.

The Traviata "fiasco"

Verdi himself described the 1853 premiere of La traviata as a "fiasco". Salvini-Donatelli was 38 years old at the time and quite stout. Her physical unsuitability for playing a beautiful young woman wasting away from tuberculosis is often cited as one of the reasons for the opera's initial failure. In the third act when the doctor announced that Violetta's illness had worsened and she had only hours to live, the first-night audience is said to have burst out laughing, with one member of the public shouting: "I see no consumption, only dropsy!" Verdi himself had expressed serious doubts about Salvini-Donatelli's suitability for the role two months before the premiere and sent his librettist, Francesco Piave, to La Fenice's manager to convey his view that Violetta required a singer "with an elegant figure who is young and sings passionately". His request for a casting change was unsuccessful.

Whatever the audience may have thought of Fanny Salvini-Donatelli's physical appearance, they were appreciative of her singing. Contemporary accounts show that her first act aria, "Sempre libera", received great applause. The critic in La Gazzetta di Venezia wrote the following day: "Salvini-Donatelli sang those coloratura passages, of which the maestro wrote so many, with an indescribable skill and perfection. She captivated the theatre." The "failure" of the opening night performance was only relative. In addition to the applause for Salvini-Donatelli's aria, the orchestral Prelude was so well received that the audience began to shout for Verdi, who had to take curtain calls even before the curtain went up on the first act. Things only started derailing in the second act, especially the singing of the baritone (Felice Varesi) and the tenor (Lodovico Graziani). La traviata also did quite well at the box office. It ran for ten performances at La Fenice that season, with an average evening profit more than double that of Verdi's other two operas in the repertory there, Ernani and Il Corsaro. In any case, a year later it was mounted again at the Teatro San Benedetto in Venice to an indisputably triumphant reception. On that occasion, the role of Violetta was taken by Maria Spezia who was thirteen years younger and considerably slimmer than Salvini-Donatelli. The first night problems do not appear to have dissuaded Salvini-Donatelli from essaying the role again. She sang it at least three more times: in 1856 in Istanbul, when Luigi Arditi brought the opera to Turkey for the first time; in 1857 at the Teatro Comunale di Bologna (the second revised version with the title Violetta); and in 1858, when she sang it in London at the Drury Lane Theatre.

Operatic roles
Fanny Salvini-Donatelli is known to have sung the following roles:

Verdi
Mina, Aroldo
Gulnara, Il corsaro
Lucrezia, I due Foscari
Elvira, Ernani
Giovanna, Giovanna d'Arco
Giselda, I Lombardi alla prima crociata
Lady Macbeth, Macbeth
Amalia, I masnadieri
Gilda, Rigoletto (under the title of Viscardello)
Violetta, La traviata
Leonora, Il trovatore
Donizetti
Norina, Don Pasquale
Linda, Linda di Chamounix
Lucia, Lucia di Lammermoor
Lucrezia, Lucrezia Borgia
Maria, Maria di Rohan
Paolina, Poliuto
Pacini
Editta, Allan Cameron
Beatrice, Buondelmonte
Lena, Il saltimbanco
Bellini
Elvira, I puritani
Beatrice, Beatrice di Tenda
Rossini
Rosina, Il barbiere di Siviglia
Mercadante
Elaisa, Il giuramento
Petrella
Bice, Marco Visconti
Balfe
Olivia Campana, Pittore e duca
Poniatowski
Angiolina, Don Desiderio
Sarmiento 
Elmina, Elmina
 
Clemenza, Il fornaretto
Bosoni
Donna Eleonora, La prigioniera
Pedrotti
Gelmina, Gelmina
Platania
Matilde, Matilde Bentivoglio
Peri
Tancreda, Tancreda

References
Notes

Sources
Boyden, Matthew; Kimberley, Nick; and Staines, Joe, The Rough Guide to Opera, Rough Guides, 2002. 
Bomberger, E. Douglas, Brainard's Biographies of American Musicians, Greenwood Publishing Group, 1999. 

Conati, Marcello, "A Chronology of the First Performances of Rigoletto", in Bollettino Verdi, Vol. 3, N. 9, January 1982, EDT srl, 
Conati, Marcello, L' Italia Musicale: 1847–1859, Centro internazionale di ricerca sui periodici musicali, University of Maryland, College Park Center for Studies in Nineteenth-Century Music, 1992
Dwight, John Sullivan, Dwight's Journal of Music, Vols. 8 and 9, Oliver Ditson and Company, 1859.
Gatti, Carlo, Verdi, the Man and His Music: the man and his music, Putnam, 1955.
Haine, Malou and Servais, Franz, L'Apollonide de Leconte de Lisle et Franz Servais: 20 ans de collaboration, Editions Mardaga, 2004. 
Kimbell, David R. B., Verdi in the Age of Italian Romanticism, Cambridge University Press Archive, 1985. 
Musical World, The, Vol. 32, J. Alfredo Novello, 1854
Phillips-Matz, Mary Jane, "The Truth About Traviata", Opera News Vol. 28, 1963–1964, Metropolitan Opera Guild, 1964. (Reprinted by the Metropolitan Opera International Radio Broadcast Information Center.) Accessed 18 January 2009.
Phillips-Matz, Mary Jane, "Venetian Glories", Opera News, February 1995. Accessed 18 January 2009.
Regli, Francesco, Dizionario Biografico (dei più celebri poeti ed artisti melodrammatici, tragici e comici, maestri, concertisti, coreografi, mimi ballerini, scenografi, giornalisti impressarii ecc. ecc. che fiorirono in Italia dal 1800 al 1860), Enrico Dalmazzo, 1860.
Resigno, Eduardo, Dizionario Verdiano, Biblioteca Universale Rizzoli, 2001, pp. 473–474. 
Rosenthal, H. and Warrack, J. The Concise Oxford Dictionary of Opera, 2nd Edition, Oxford University Press, 1979
Sadie, Stanley (ed) The New Grove Dictionary of Opera, Macmillan, 1992. 
Salvini, Celso, Tommaso Salvini: nella storia del teatro italiano e nella vita del suo tempo, Cappelli, 1955
Shaman, William, et al., More EJS: Discography of the Edward J. Smith Recordings, Greenwood Publishing Group, 1999. 
Teatri, arti e letteratura, Vol. 59, 1853–1854, Gov. della Volpe, 1854
Teatro Alighieri (Ravenna) Teatro di Tradizione Dante Alighieri. Accessed 18 January 2009.
Teatro La Fenice, "La Traviata – Programma di sala", November 2004. Accessed 18 January 2009.
Teatro Regio di Parma, Archives. Accessed 18 January 2009.
Town Talk, Vol. 1 (May 8, 1858 – May 14, 1859), H. Tuck, 1859.
Virella Cassañes, Francisco, La ópera en Barcelona: Estudio histórico-crítico, Redondo y Xumetra, 1888, p. 357.
Von Buchau, Stephanie, "The Traviata Saga", San Francisco Opera, 1991. Accessed 18 January 2009.

1815 births
1891 deaths
Italian operatic sopranos
19th-century Italian actresses
Italian stage actresses
19th-century Italian women opera singers
Musicians from Florence